Alto is an unincorporated community in Lincoln County, New Mexico, United States.

Description
Alto received its name from the Spanish word "high" because of its elevation.

Alto Lakes is a planned, residential and recreational community covering 1689+ acres along two mountain ridges in Alto. Alto Lakes was conceived and developed by Don Blaugrund beginning in 1967. The heart of the community is the Alto Lakes Golf & Country Club which includes two private 18-hole golf courses, dining, swimming and tennis facilities. Membership in the club is included with ownership of a home, town home, or lot within the community. The residential area of the community includes 1,150+ homes, 83 town homes, and approximately 1,000 vacant lots. Alto Lakes is governed by the Alto Lakes Water & Sanitation District and by the Alto Lakes Special Zoning District as well as community covenants.

Transportation

Airports

Major highways
  New Mexico State Road 48
  New Mexico State Road 220

See also

References

External links

 Alto Lakes - Local Government Web Site

Unincorporated communities in Lincoln County, New Mexico
Unincorporated communities in New Mexico